The 1986 BCE Belgian Classic was a professional non-ranking snooker tournament only held once between 14 and 17 January 1986 at the Ostend Casino in Ostend, Belgium.

Terry Griffiths won the tournament, defeating Kirk Stevens 9–7 in the final.

Another championship was due to take place in 1987 played at the same venue between 7 and 15 March. With the withdrawal of all seven of Barry Hearn's Matchroom players including champion Griffiths (they were playing in the new Kent Cup in China around that time), the tournament was cancelled.

Main draw

References

Belgian Classic
Belgian Classic
Belgian Classic
Sport in Belgium